Dašnica may refer to:

 Dašnica, Bijeljina, a neighborhood of Bijeljina, Bosnia and Herzegovina
 Dašnica, Aleksandrovac, a village in Serbia
 Dašnica, Aleksinac, a village in Serbia